Kazimierz Paszkiewicz (12 February 1935 – 18 June 1980) was a Polish modern pentathlete. He competed at the 1960 Summer Olympics.

References

1935 births
1980 deaths
Polish male modern pentathletes
Olympic modern pentathletes of Poland
Modern pentathletes at the 1960 Summer Olympics
Sportspeople from Poznań